Overland Pacific is a 1954 American color Western film directed by Fred F. Sears and starring Jock Mahoney, Peggie Castle and Adele Jergens.

Plot
Ross Granger noisily practices sending telegraph while sharing a stagecoach with a uninterested man and an irate woman. They halt at a telegraph pole which is adorned with a telegraph worker with an arrow in his back. They place the body on the top of the coach but it falls before they reach Oaktown. Granger has a fist fight with the driver over the loss. He sends the driver back to get the body.

At the Silver Dollar Saloon he meets his old friend from the Civil War: Del Stewart. Del invites him to dinner with him and his girlfriend Ann and they reminisce.

Outside town men are laying a new railroad track for Overland Pacific when they are attacked by Comanche indians armed with bow and arrows and rifles. There is also suspicion of sabotage.

Del is engaged to Ann Dennison, whose father runs the railroad. Del goes out to see the father who is surveying the land. Del tries to persuade the father to detour the railway to go through Oaktown, but he resists. Del's partner arrives and shoots the father dead. The killer and Del attend the funeral.

Granger starts work as a telegraph operator but it is thought he is an impostor. The sheriff goes out to warn Granger that trouble is brewing. The sheriff shows where the Comanche have rifles hidden. An ambush is waiting from Jason. Granger suspects this but is shot in the chest, but manages to kill Jason. The sheriff is revealed as being sided with the other side and draws his gun on Granger. Granger collapses before he is shot.

Granger revives in town. He knows now Jason killed Mr Dennison. Del is revealed as hiring the Comanche to attack the railroad workers.

A jealous Jessie Lorraine, his dance-hall girl, loves Del as well. Del and his cohorts are secretly selling repeater rifles to Chief Dark Thunder and the Comanche Indians, who do not want the railroad crossing their land. Del and rancher Broden want the Overland Pacific to re-route through Oaktown, where they own property.

A hired gun and corrupt sheriff both end up dead. Ann breaks off her engagement upon learning Del's scheme, pleasing Jessie until she discovers the true nature of Del, then is shot by him. It is left to Granger to win a shootout with Del, after which he and Ann commence a romance.

Cast
 Jock Mahoney as Granger
 Peggie Castle as Ann Dennison
 William Bishop as Del Stewart
 Adele Jergens as Jessie
 Pat Hogan as Dark Thunder, leader of the Comanche
 Chris Alcaide as Jason, Del's hired gun
 Chubby Johnson as Sheriff Blaney
 Walter Sande as Mr Dennison
 House Peters Jr. as Perkins
 Fred Graham as Jenks the stage driver

Production
Jock Mahoney signed a five-picture deal with Edward Small of which this was the first. It was originally known as Silver Dollar. Although it is generally regarded as a low budget Western, it was actually one of the first films to use blood squibs to simulate someone being shot. This happens twice: at around the 25 minute mark when Jason (Chris Alcaide) shoots and kills Dennison (Walter Sande), then around the 35 minute mark when Jason shoots and wounds Granger (Jock Mahoney).

References

External links
Overland Pacific at IMDb

1954 films
American Western (genre) films
1954 Western (genre) films
Films produced by Edward Small
1950s English-language films
United Artists films
Films directed by Fred F. Sears
1950s American films